Cemetery Road Bridge is a historic bridge located in Glendale Cemetery in Washington, Illinois. Engineer Frederick Rickman designed the bridge for the City of Washington in 1893, and it was built the following year by stonemason Jacob Habluetzel. Habluetzel built the bridge from square cut blocks of ashlar stone. The bridge is the best-preserved bridge of its type in Tazewell County and is the only stone arch bridge in the area that is still supported solely by its arches.

The bridge was added to the National Register of Historic Places on May 20, 1998.

References

Road bridges on the National Register of Historic Places in Illinois
Bridges completed in 1894
National Register of Historic Places in Tazewell County, Illinois
Stone arch bridges in the United States
Bridges in Tazewell County, Illinois